"La notte" is a song by Italian singer Arisa. It was written by Giuseppe Anastasi and produced by Mauro Pagani.

It was released by Warner Music Italy on 15 February 2012 as the lead single from her third studio album Amami. The song was Arisa's entry for the Sanremo Music Festival 2012, where it placed second in the grand final.

"La notte" topped the FIMI Singles Chart and achieved four platinum cerifications in Italy. It was covered in Portuguese by Brazilian singer Tiê with the title "A Noite".

Music video
The music video of "La notte" was directed by Gaetano Morbioli and released onto YouTube on 15 February 2012.

Track listing

Charts

Certifications

References

2010s ballads
2012 singles
2012 songs
Arisa songs
Folk ballads
Italian-language songs
Number-one singles in Italy
Sanremo Music Festival songs
Songs written by Giuseppe Anastasi
Warner Music Group singles